In statistics, Wilks' lambda distribution (named for Samuel S. Wilks), is a probability distribution used in multivariate hypothesis testing, especially with regard to the likelihood-ratio test and multivariate analysis of variance (MANOVA).

Definition 
Wilks' lambda distribution is defined from two independent Wishart distributed variables as the ratio distribution of their determinants,

given

independent and with 

where p is the number of dimensions.  In the context of likelihood-ratio tests m is typically the error degrees of freedom, and n is the hypothesis degrees of freedom, so that  is the total degrees of freedom.

Approximations 
Computations or tables of the Wilks' distribution for higher dimensions are not readily available and one usually resorts to approximations.
One approximation is attributed to M. S. Bartlett and works for large m allows Wilks' lambda to be approximated with a chi-squared distribution

Another approximation is attributed to C. R. Rao.

Properties 
There is a symmetry among the parameters of the Wilks distribution,

Related distributions 
The distribution can be related to a product of independent beta-distributed random variables

As such it can be regarded as a multivariate generalization of the beta distribution.

From the relations between a beta and an F-distribution, Wilks' lambda can be related to the F-distribution when one of the parameters of the Wilks lambda distribution is either 1 or 2, e.g.,

and

See also 

 Chi-squared distribution
 Dirichlet distribution
 F-distribution
 Gamma distribution
 Hotelling's T-squared distribution
 Student's t-distribution
 Wishart distribution

References 

Continuous distributions